Dan Brenner (born Daniel Abraham Brenner, December 19, 1963) is an American composer, musician, and psychiatrist. Brenner was a member of the band Magnet,  with Moe Tucker (former drummer in the Velvet Underground)  in the late 1990s, and of the rap/performance-art band Razor Magnet with his brother, filmmaker Evan Brenner from 1985-1988.  He was a member of the Boston bands Green Fuse and Gunga Din in the early 1990s, and prior to that, while a student at Harvard College, The Love Monsters. Brenner has written the scores for three feature films, including Rhythm Thief  (Special Jury Prize at Sundance Film Festival, 1995),  Spare Me  (Priz Tournage winner Avignon Film Festival, 1993), and The Riddle  (a.k.a. Sasha’s Riddle, winner Long Island Film Festival, 2010,  official selection Toronto Film Festival 1997).  Brenner also co-wrote the script for The Riddle, for which he was awarded the 2010 Mario Puzo Screenplay Award.   Some of Brenner's film composition is credited as "Danny Brenner." He was as Producer on the Foggy Notion CD Mission.
 
In 2011, Brenner released a solo CD, Little Dark Angel, produced by 12-time Grammy Winner Jay Newland. Little Dark Angel featured Larry Campbell (guitar, pedal steel, banjo, fiddle, mandolin), Will Lee (bass), Shawn Pelton (drums), Brian Mitchell (keyboard, harmonica, and accordion), and former Morphine member Dana Colley (saxophone, bass clarinet). In 2016, Brenner released Tough, also produced by Jay Newland. Tough featured Dan Reiser (drums and percussion), Entcho Todorow (violin), Zev Katz (electric and acoustic bass), Adam Levy (acoustic, electric, baritone guitar), Dana Colley (clarinet), Glenn Patscha (piano, organ, accordion, harmonium, pump organ, backing vocals) Steve Williams: (additional percussion), Sherrod Barnes (guitar) Jay Newland (baritone guitar) and Dave Eggar (cello).

Personal life 

Dan Brenner was born in New York City, attended Saint Ann's School in Brooklyn Heights, and graduated from Harvard College. Brenner later attended medical school, and was a resident in Psychiatry at the Cambridge Hospital from 1995-2000. He was a Clinical Instructor in Psychiatry at Harvard Medical School from 1995-2010, and received psychoanalytic training at the Boston Psychoanalytic Society and Institute. He is Medical Director of Cambridge Biotherapies, in Cambridge, MA. He is married to Heather Thompson-Brenner.

Discography

Solo 
2014  Tough
2011 Little Dark Angel

Compilation 
2010 Working on a Building (three songs)

Magnet 
1999 Shark Bait (produced by David Lowery)
1998 Which Way
1997 Don’t Be A Penguin

Foggy Notion 
1995 Mission

Razor Magnet 
1990 You're In good Hands

Green Fuse 
1987 Sleeping Dairy Death Dirge (7” EP)
I Have a copy of this record and it is a double EP (7")
The actual songs are "Dairy Queen", "Sleeping Sara", "Death Dirge", and "Summertime"
AND the date on it is 1988

The Love Monsters 
1984 "Kiss Away The Tears" (7” EP)

Filmography

Composer 
2000 Wrist
1996 The Riddle (a.k.a. Sasha's Riddle)
1994 Rhythm Thief 
1993 Spare Me
1993 Two Boneheads 
1992 Breaking and Entering
1989 The Man Who Invented The Twinkie
1989 The Starving Song
1988 Doctor Fisher
1988 Santaphobia
1987 Waking Up Crazy
1987 Consumed

Screenwriter 
1996 The Riddle (a.k.a. Sasha's Riddle)
1993 Two Bits
1988 Doctor Fisher

Acting 
2005 In Loving Memory
2001 Works of Wonder
1988 Doctor Fisher
1985 Mister Brain

References

External links
 

1963 births
Living people
Songwriters from New York (state)
American male composers
21st-century American composers
Male actors from New York City
Harvard College alumni
American psychiatrists
21st-century American male musicians
Saint Ann's School (Brooklyn) alumni
American male songwriters